Bornholm is a small township in the Great Southern region of Western Australia located between Albany and Denmark on the Lower Denmark Road.

Situated along the railway between Albany and Denmark, the town formed around the railway siding. The surrounding area has been allocated into many small farms with areas mostly between 30 and 100 acres. Mixed farming predominates the area with fruits, vegetables and raising stock being commonplace. The area had been settled prior to 1912.

In 1923 the Bornholm Hall was officially opened by John Scaddan, the MLA for Albany.

In 2010, the community was menaced by a bushfire that burnt through  of bushland near the beach, closing parts of the Bibbulmun Track. The fire was contained the following day.

References

Towns in Western Australia
Great Southern (Western Australia)